Sperduti is an Italian surname. Notable people with the surname include:

 Alessandro Sperduti, Italian actor
 Anthony Sperduti, American businessman 
 Giuseppe Sperduti, Italian jurist
 Mauricio Sperduti (born 1986), Argentine footballer
 Paolo Sperduti (1725 – 1799), Italian painter

See also
 Sperduti nel buio, 1947 Italian drama film

Italian-language surnames